Neuroxena is a genus of tiger moths in the family Erebidae. The genus was described by William Forsell Kirby in 1896.

Species
The genus consists of the following species:
Neuroxena aberrans
Neuroxena albofasciata
Neuroxena ansorgei
Neuroxena auremaculatus
Neuroxena flammea
Neuroxena fulleri
Neuroxena funereus
Neuroxena lasti
Neuroxena medioflavus
Neuroxena obscurascens
Neuroxena postrubidus
Neuroxena rectilineata
Neuroxena rubriceps
Neuroxena simulans
Neuroxena sulphureovitta
Neuroxena truncatus

References

Nyctemerina
Moth genera